Wilhelm Christian Karl, 3rd Prince of Solms Braunfels (9 January 1759, in Braunfels – 20 March 1837, in Braunfels) was by succession an immediate Prince, then a nobleman and head of the Princely House of Solms-Braunfels, a Prussian major general and Hessian deputy.

Life

Family 
William was a member of the  Princely House of Solms-Braunfels. His grandfather Frederick William (1696–1761) was the first Prince of Solms-Braunfels. His parents were the imperial colonel and lieutenant general of the United Provinces Ferdinand Wilhelm Ernst (1721–1783) and Countess Sophie Christine Wilhelmine of Solms-Laubach. first daughter and second child of Christian August, Count of Solms-Laubach. Prussian Major General Frederick William (1770–1814) was one of his younger brothers.

On 6 October 1792, he married Wild- und Rheingräfin Auguste of Salm-Grumbach (1771–1810) half-sister of Friedrich, Prince of Salm-Horstmar. They had four children:

 Wilhelmine (1793–1865) ∞ Alexius, Prince of Bentheim and Steinfurt (1781–1866) and had issue
 Sophie Auguste (1796–1855) ∞ Johann August Karl, Prince of Wied (1779–1836) and had issue; they were the paternal grandparents of Queen Elisabeth of Romania
 Ferdinand, 4th Prince of Solms-Braunfels (1797–1873) ∞ Countess Ottilie of Solms-Laubach (1807–1884), without issue
 Karl Wilhelm Bernhard (1800–1868), General of Cavalry

By his maitresse Anna Elisabeth Becker (1779–1852), whom he married morganatically once widower, he had three children who received patronymic Wilhelmi

Ancestry

Footnotes 

1759 births
1837 deaths
People from Braunfels
People from Solms-Braunfels
House of Solms-Braunfels
German princes
Major generals of Prussia
Military personnel from Hesse